About Britain is a series of 13 books published by Collins for the Festival of Britain in 1951 under the general editorship of Geoffrey Grigson who also wrote the first two volumes in the series.

Titles
 West Country by Geoffrey Grigson
 Wessex by Geoffrey Grigson
 Home Counties by R. S. R. Fitter
 East Anglia by R. H. Mottram
 Chilterns to Black Country by W. G. Hoskins
 South Wales and the Marches by W. J. Gruffydd
 North Wales and the Marches by W. J Gruffydd
 East Midlands and the Peak by W. G. Hoskins
 Lancashire and Yorkshire by Leo Walmsley
 The Lakes to Tyneside by Sid Chaplin
 The Lowlands of Scotland by John R. Allan
 Highlands and Islands of Scotland by Alastair M. Dunnett
 Northern Ireland by E. Estyn Evans

References

External links 

Books about the United Kingdom
1951 non-fiction books
Series of non-fiction books